Kentbrooksite is a moderately rare mineral of the eudialyte group, with chemical formula . This extended formula shows the presence of cyclic silicate groups and dominance of Si at the M4 site, according to the nomenclature of the eudialyte group. The characteristic features of kentbrooksite, that make it different from eudialyte are: (1) dominancy of fluorine (the only currently known example among the whole group), (2) dominancy of manganese, and (3) dominancy of niobium.  Trace hafnium and magnesium are also reported. Kentbrooksite is relatively common when compared to most other species of the group.

Occurrence
Kentbrooksite was found in alkaline pegmatites within pulaskites of the Kangerdlugssuaq intrusion in East Greenland.

Notes on chemistry
Rare earth elements (REE) in kentbrooksite are dominated by cerium and yttrium. Potassium, strontium, iron, aluminium, titanium, magnesium are present as other admixtures. An important fraction of fluorine is substituted by chlorine and hydroxyl groups.

References

Cyclosilicates
Sodium minerals
Calcium minerals
Manganese minerals
Zirconium minerals
Niobium minerals
Trigonal minerals
Minerals in space group 160